The grass warblers are small passerine birds belonging to the genus Locustella. Formerly placed in the paraphyletic "Old World warbler" assemblage, they are now considered the northernmost representatives of a largely Gondwanan  family, the Locustellidae.

These are rather drab brownish "warblers" usually associated with fairly open grassland, shrubs or marshes. Some are streaked, others plain, all are difficult to view. They are insectivorous.

The most characteristic feature of this group is that the song of several species is a mechanical insect-like reeling which gives rise to the group's scientific name.

Species breeding in temperate regions are strongly migratory.

Taxonomy
The genus Locustella was introduced by the German naturalist Johann Jakob Kaup in 1829 with the common grasshopper warbler (Locustella naevia) as the type species. The genus name Locustella is from Latin and is a diminutive of locusta,  "grasshopper". Like the English name, this refers to the insect-like song of some species.

There are 23 species placed in the genus:
Lanceolated warbler, Locustella lanceolata
Brown bush warbler, Locustella luteoventris
Long-billed bush warbler, Locustella major
Common grasshopper warbler, Locustella naevia
Chinese bush warbler, Locustella tacsanowskia
Bamboo warbler, Locustella alfredi
River warbler Locustella fluviatilis
Savi's warbler, Locustella luscinioides
Friendly bush warbler, Locustella accentor
Sulawesi bush warbler, Locustella castanea
Seram bush warbler, Locustella musculus
Buru bush warbler, Locustella disturbans
Long-tailed bush warbler, Locustella caudata
Baikal bush warbler, Locustella davidi
Spotted bush warbler, Locustella thoracica
West Himalayan bush warbler, Locustella kashmirensis 
Taiwan bush warbler, Locustella alishanensis
Russet bush warbler, Locustella mandelli
Dalat bush warbler, Locustella idonea
Benguet bush warbler, Locustella seebohmi
Javan bush warbler, Locustella montis
Sichuan bush warbler, Locustella chengi
Taliabu bush warbler, Locustella portenta

This genus formerly included additional species. A molecular phylogenetic study of the grassbird family Locustellidae published in 2018 found that the genus Locustella consisted of two distinct clades. The genus was split and six species were moved to the newly erected genus Helopsaltes.

A fossil acrocoracoid from the Late Miocene (about 11 mya) of Rudabánya (NE Hungary) is quite similar to this bone in the present genus.  Given its rather early age (most Passerida genera are not known until the Pliocene), it is not too certain that it is correctly placed here, but it is highly likely to belong to the Locustellidae, or the Sylvioidea at the least. As the grasshopper warblers are the only known locustellid warblers from Europe, it is still fairly likely that the bone piece belongs to a basal Locustella.

References

Locustella